Prabodhananda Sarasvati was a Gaudiya Vaishnava, and later Radhavallabha, sannyasi.

A Telugu Brahmin from Srirangam, Prabodhananda formerly followed Sri Vaishnavism but was converted to the path of devotion to Radha Krishna by Chaitanya Mahaprabhu. When Chaitanya traveled through south India in 1509–10, he stayed at the house of Venkata Bhatta, the father of Gopal Bhatta, priest of Srirangam. Venkata and his two brothers, Gopala's uncles Trimalla and Prabodhananda Sarasvati, "were converted from their Sri Vaishnava faith in Lakshmi Narayana as supreme to one in Radha Krishna" as Svayam Bhagavan. The dialog of this conversion is recorded in Chaitanya Charitamrita, the 16th-century biography of Chaitanya by Krishna dasa Kaviraja.

Sometime after his conversion, Prabodhananda composed a text in praise of the sacred land of Krishna's birth, Vrindavan, Sri Vrndavana Mahimamrta.

See also
Gopal Bhatta Goswami
Vrindavan

References and notes

16th-century Indian poets
Sanskrit poets
Hindu poets
Indian male poets
Poets from Tamil Nadu
Devotees of Krishna
Indian Vaishnavites
Vaishnava saints
Gaudiya religious leaders
Bhakti movement
People from Tiruchirappalli district